Lake Metigoshe is a  lake in both Bottineau County, North Dakota and the Rural Municipality of Winchester, Manitoba. It is located in the Turtle Mountains on the Canada–United States border. The majority of the lake is within the United States, with only the northernmost tip in Canada. The Lake Metigoshe State Park encompasses a vast amount of shoreline around the lake. It offers swimming, canoeing, sailing, water-skiing and other water sports, modern and primitive camping areas, and picnicking. There is also the Skinautiques waterskiing club which is the only international waterskiing club in the United States.

See also 
 List of lakes of North Dakota

References

Metigoshe
Metigoshe